The 2013 Australian Open described in detail, in the form of day-by-day summaries.

Day 1 (14 January)

In men's singles, on the opening day, play began with the defending champion and world no. 1, Novak Djokovic, dismantling Frenchman Paul-Henri Mathieu. The other top seeds cruised through with 4th-seed David Ferrer winning over Olivier Rochus and 5th-seed Tomáš Berdych over Michael Russell. Last year's quarterfinalist Kei Nishikori also came through over Victor Hănescu. Former finalist Marcos Baghdatis struggled to get past Spaniard Albert Ramos, winning in five sets; another seed in Fernando Verdasco, who was a former semifinalist, was also pushed to his limits, winning in 5 over David Goffin. All other seeds came through with the exception of 11th seed Juan Mónaco who lost to Andrey Kuznetsov after suffering from a back injury. The Australians didn't have a good day with all three that competed in the day losing. The first of which was Matthew Ebden falling to 23rd seed Mikhail Youzhny despite leading 2 sets to 0. His exit was followed by Australian wildcard John Millman who fell also in five to Tatsuma Ito. In the final men's match of the day, 8th seed Janko Tipsarević defeated former world no. 1 Lleyton Hewitt in three tight sets.

In women's singles, world no. 2 and last year's finalist Maria Sharapova defeated compatriot Olga Puchkova in 55 minutes. 4th seed Agnieszka Radwańska struggled but got through Australian wild card Bojana Bobusic to protect her record of 10–0 matches won all in straight sets in 2013. Other Australians fell as well with Ashleigh Barty losing to 15th seed Dominika Cibulková, Casey Dellacqua losing to Madison Keys, Sacha Jones losing to Kristýna Plíšková, and Olivia Rogowska losing to Vesna Dolonc. The only Australian to win in the day was 9th seed Samantha Stosur, ending her six-match losing streak in Australia to Chang Kai-chen. Venus Williams cruised past her first-round match over Galina Voskoboeva. Li Na, the 2011 finalist and 6th seed, also won over Sesil Karatantcheva. 11th seed Marion Bartoli needed an hour and forty minutes in a win over Anabel Medina Garrigues. The only seed to fall was 32nd seed Mona Barthel losing to Ksenia Pervak.
 Day 1 attendance: 61,955
 Seeds out:
 Men's singles:  Juan Mónaco [11]
 Women's singles:  Mona Barthel [32]
 Schedule of Play

Day 2 (15 January)

In men's singles, World no. 3 and US Open champion Andy Murray started things off in his half with an over Robin Haase. world no. 2 and Wimbledon champion Roger Federer made quick work of Benoît Paire. Other top seeds, 7th seed Jo-Wilfried Tsonga and 6th seed Juan Martín del Potro also got through over Frenchmen Michaël Llodra and Adrian Mannarino, respectively. Other seeds also came through with 9th seed Richard Gasquet winning over Albert Montañés, 12th seed Marin Čilić defeating Marinko Matosevic, and 13th seed Milos Raonic winning over Jan Hájek. Australians Luke Saville and John-Patrick Smith fell to Go Soeda and to João Sousa. In the battle of the Aussie wildcards James Duckworth outlasted compatriot Ben Mitchell. Australian hope Bernard Tomic made quick work of Leonardo Mayer. Many seeds fell in the day; 18th seed Alexandr Dolgopolov losing to Gaël Monfils, and was joined by 19th seed Tommy Haas, 27th seed Martin Kližan, and 29th seed Thomaz Bellucci.

In women's singles, day two play began with the defending champion and top seeded, Victoria Azarenka came through with a victory over the often-unpredictable Monica Niculescu. Serena Williams continued her good form with a win over Edina Gallovits-Hall, despite twisting her ankle at the 5th game of the first set. 8th seed Petra Kvitová struggled to get past Francesca Schiavone, winning. 10th seed and former world no. 1 Caroline Wozniacki also needed 3 sets against Sabine Lisicki winning despite being down 0–3 in the third. Other seeds Maria Kirilenko and Sloane Stephens got through with wins over Vania King and Simona Halep respectively. 20th seed Yanina Wickmayer ended the hopes of Australian Jarmila Gajdošová with a win. The biggest upset of the day and the tournament so far was when 7th seed and last year's quarterfinalist Sara Errani fell to Spaniard Carla Suárez Navarro. Another major upset was when Kimiko Date-Krumm became the oldest woman in the Open era to win a main draw match at the Australian Open with a victory over 12th seed Nadia Petrova. Other upsets included 24th seed and Brisbane finalist Anastasia Pavlyuchenkova losing to Lesia Tsurenko, 28th seed Yaroslava Shvedova losing to Annika Beck, and 31st seed Urszula Radwańska to Jamie Hampton.

 Day 2 attendance: 68,055
 Seeds out:
Men's Singles: Alexandr Dolgopolov [18],  Tommy Haas [19],  Martin Kližan [27],  Thomaz Bellucci [29]
Women's Singles:  Sara Errani [7],  Nadia Petrova [12],  Anastasia Pavlyuchenkova [24],  Yaroslava Shvedova [28],  Urszula Radwańska [31]
Schedule of Play

Day 3 (16 January)

In men's singles, It was 4th seed David Ferrer who started things off with a win over American lucky loser Tim Smyczek. He was joined in the third round by 5th seeded Czech Tomáš Berdych, who defeated Guillaume Rufin. Two other seeded Spaniards came through with 10th seed Nicolás Almagro defeating compatriot Daniel Gimeno-Traver and former semifinalist Fernando Verdasco who came through with ease against Xavier Malisse. Japanese Kei Nishikori triumph against opponent Carlos Berlocq to advance to the third round. In the battle of the Americans Sam Querrey took on Brian Baker and won when Baker retired when he was leading. Cypriot Marcos Baghdatis came back against Tatsuma Ito recovering from a slow start. The only seed to fall was 23rd seed Mikhail Youzhny, when he lost to compatriot Evgeny Donskoy. In the final match of the day, 2-time defending champion Novak Djokovic made quick work of American Ryan Harrison.

In women's singles, Angelique Kerber was the first to advance to the 3rd round with a victory over Czech Lucie Hradecká. She was joined by Wimbledon finalist Agnieszka Radwańska who remains undefeated in 2013 defeating Irina-Camelia Begu. Serbians 13th seed Ana Ivanovic and 22nd seed Jelena Janković both won against	Chan Yung-jan and Maria João Koehler respectively to set up a third round clash. Julia Görges is also quietly going about the draw with a win over Romina Oprandi 2nd seed Maria Sharapova won 24 straight games with another win over Misaki Doi. Venus Williams also got through easily over France's Alizé Cornet to set up a third-round meeting with Sharapova. However, Australia's hope Samantha Stosur wasn't so fortunate leading the falling seeds when she lost to Zheng Jie after leading and serving for the match at 5–2 in the third set. Stosur was joined by other seeds Sydney finalistDominika Cibulková, Klára Zakopalová, Tamira Paszek.

 Day 3 attendance: 66,568
 Seeds out:
Men's Singles: Mikhail Youzhny [23]
Women's Singles:  Samantha Stosur [9],  Dominika Cibulková [15],  Klára Zakopalová [23],  Tamira Paszek [30]
Men's Doubles:  Ivan Dodig /  Marcelo Melo [10],  Santiago González /  Scott Lipsky [13],  Julian Knowle /  Filip Polášek [14],  František Čermák /  Michal Mertiňák [15]
Women's Doubles:  Bethanie Mattek-Sands /  Sania Mirza [10],  Vania King /  Yaroslava Shvedova [11]
Schedule of Play

Day 4 (17 January)

In men's singles, day four play began with British Andy Murray having an easy win over Portuguese João Sousa. Frenchman Jo-Wilfried Tsonga overcomes Japanese Go Soeda in three tight sets, while compatriot Richard Gasquet made quick work of Alejandro Falla. Big serving Canadian and 13th seed Milos Raonic stormed pass Lukáš Rosol. The Australians had mixed results with James Duckworth falling to Blaž Kavčič in a tight five setter and with Bernard Tomic winning in a tight four setter over German qualifier Daniel Brands. Sixth seed Juan Martín del Potro continues with ease winning over Benjamin Becker. 17-time slam champion Roger Federer defeated a resurgent Nikolay Davydenko. Two seeds fell, with 25th seed Florian Mayer losing convincingly to Lithuanian qualifier Ričardas Berankis, and 30th seed Marcel Granollers falling to Jérémy Chardy. Frenchman Gaël Monfils outlasted Chinese Taipei's Lu Yen-hsun.

In women's singles, day four play began with the defending champion and top seeded Belarusian Victoria Azarenka dismantling Greek Eleni Daniilidou. Russian 14th seed Maria Kirilenko also got through with a win over Peng Shuai. American and third seed Serena Williams made quick work of Spaniard Garbiñe Muguruza; however, Williams had another incident when she hit her face with a racket. Another American Sloane Stephens also got through the 3rd round win over fellow 19-year-old Kristina Mladenovic. Former world no. 1 Caroline Wozniacki also got through with a win over 16-year-old Donna Vekić. Forty-two-year-old Kimiko Date-Krumm continued her run defeating Shahar Pe'er. In the final match of the day 8th seed Petra Kvitová continues her bad form falling to Australian-born Brit Laura Robson in a match that had 30 doubles faults combined 18 from the Czech and 12 from the Brit. Other seeds that fell were 17th seed Lucie Šafářová, 21st seed Varvara Lepchenko, and 26th seed Hsieh Su-wei all falling in straight sets.

 Day 4 attendance: 55,671
 Seeds out:
Men's Singles:  Florian Mayer [25],  Marcel Granollers [30]
Women's Singles:  Petra Kvitová [8],  Lucie Šafářová [17],  Varvara Lepchenko [21],  Hsieh Su-wei [26]
Men's Doubles:  Leander Paes /  Radek Štěpánek [2],  Mariusz Fyrstenberg /  Marcin Matkowski [8]
Women's Doubles:  Daniela Hantuchová /  Anabel Medina Garrigues [16]
Schedule of Play

Day 5 (18 January)

In men's singles, day five play began with the defending champion and top seeded Serbian Novak Djokovic who was tested by Czech Radek Štěpánek in three sets. His fellow Serb and 8th seed Janko Tipsarević was pushed by Frenchman Julien Benneteau but won in 5 sets. 16th seed Kei Nishikori cruised pass Evgeny Donskoy after a sluggish start winning in straights. 10th seed Nicolás Almagro made to work hard as well in three over 24th seed Jerzy Janowicz. Swiss Stanislas Wawrinka ended the hopes of American tennis in the men's side when he defeated Sam Querrey in tight three sets. South African Kevin Anderson was the only lower ranked player in the day to win when he defeated 22nd seed Fernando Verdasco. At the night session, 5th seed Tomáš Berdych continues to cruise, winning over Jürgen Melzer. In the final match of the day Spaniard David Ferrer got into the third round winning over former finalist Marcos Baghdatis

In women's singles, day five play began with Polish Agnieszka Radwańska defeating British Heather Watson to continue her undefeated 2013 run. Celebrating her birthday Angelique Kerber got a great present defeating American wildcard Madison Keys. Another German Julia Görges got through the fourth round with a win over Zheng Jie after coming from 4–5 down with Zheng serving for the match. world No.19 Ekaterina Makarova downed French world No.11 Marion Bartoli in three tight sets. In the battle of the Serbs and former world no. 1's Ana Ivanovic dispatched Jelena Janković. China's Li Na continues her good 2013 run with a win over Romania's Sorana Cîrstea. Belgium's Kirsten Flipkens defeated Russia's Valeria Savinykh to advance to her first slam fourth round. In the blockbuster match of the tournament so far, it saw Maria Sharapova defeating Venus Williams with relative ease.

 Day 5 attendance: 70,426
 Seeds out:
Men's Singles:  Sam Querrey [20],  Fernando Verdasco [22],  Jerzy Janowicz [24],  Jürgen Melzer [26],  Marcos Baghdatis [28],  Radek Štěpánek [31],  Julien Benneteau [32]
Women's Singles:  Marion Bartoli [11],  Jelena Janković [22],  Venus Williams [25],  Sorana Cîrstea [27]
Women's Doubles:  Andrea Hlaváčková /  Lucie Hradecká [2],  Maria Kirilenko /  Lisa Raymond [3],  Raquel Kops-Jones /  Abigail Spears [8]
Schedule of Play

Day 6 (19 January)

In the Men's Singles, Frenchman Richard Gasquet who got to the fourth round in the bottom half first when he defeated Ivan Dodig. He was followed by Olympic gold medalist Andy Murray who defeated Lithuanian qualifier Ričardas Berankis in three tight sets. It was followed by the biggest upset of the tournament so far when 6th seed Juan Martín del Potro fell to unseeded Frenchman Jérémy Chardy. It was followed by another upset when 21st Andreas Seppi eliminating 12th seed Marin Čilić. Jo-Wilfried Tsonga then made quick work of Slovenian Blaž Kavčič to face Gasquet in the next round. Canadian Milos Raonic defeated Philipp Kohlschreiber. In the night session, in the anticipated match between Roger Federer and the only Australian to get to the third round Bernard Tomic, Federer came through. In the most dramatic match of the tournament so far it was a battle of sheer guts and determination as both struggled with injury as two Frenchmen Gilles Simon who struggled through leg and forearm cramps, while Gaël Monfils battled hand blisters. The match saw a 71-shot rally, one of the many long rallies in the match. Simon outlasted Monfils winning.

In the Women's Singles, it was 14th seed Russian Maria Kirilenko was the first victor of the day when she defeated 20th seed Belgian Yanina Wickmayer. Another Russian in Svetlana Kuznetsova got through the 4th round defeating Carla Suárez Navarro World no. 1 and defending champion Victoria Azarenka got her first challenge in the match in American Jamie Hampton winning in three sets. Serena Williams continues her winning streak defeating Ayumi Morita, winning the last 6 games and saw Williams serve her second 207 km/h serve in the tournament. Another Russian made it through the 4th round in Elena Vesnina when she upset 16th seed Roberta Vinci, making it 5 Russians in the fourth round. Dane Caroline Wozniacki is slowly getting into the draw with a win over Qualifier Lesia Tsurenko. In the battle of the youngsters American Sloane Stephens defeated Brit Laura Robson. The dream run of 42-year-old Kimiko Date-Krumm came to an end in the third round, with 21-year-old Bojana Jovanovski taking her out with a loss.

 Day 6 attendance: 80,735
 Seeds out:
Men's Singles:  Juan Martín del Potro [6],  Marin Čilić [12],  Philipp Kohlschreiber [17]
Women's Singles:  Roberta Vinci [16],  Yanina Wickmayer [20]
Men's Doubles:  Max Mirnyi /  Horia Tecău [4],   Robert Lindstedt /  Nenad Zimonjić [7],  Alexander Peya /  Bruno Soares [9],  Rohan Bopanna /  Rajeev Ram [12],  Jonathan Marray /  André Sá [16]
Women's Doubles:  Anna-Lena Grönefeld /  Květa Peschke [9]
Schedule of Play

Day 7 (20 January)

In the Men's Singles, It was a battle of last year's quarterfinalists 4th seed David Ferrer and 16th seed Kei Nishikori, Nishikori lead the head-to-head 2–1, but Ferrer proved to be too strong as he won easily. Ferrer will now face compatriot Nicolás Almagro who advance to the quarterfinals after Janko Tipsarević retired when Almagro was leading with a left foot injury. 5th seed Tomáš Berdych continues his good run and hasn't drop a set in the tournament with a win over Kevin Anderson The final match of the day was a marathon battle of wills between world no. 1 and defending champion Novak Djokovic and the no. 2 Swiss and 15th seed Stanislas Wawrinka. It went to five hour and two minutes before seeing Djokovic outlast Wawrinka, and has been rated the match of the tournament so far. Djokovic, showing great stamina, finally got hold of the match in a grueling last set. Wawrinka winning the first set 6–1, proved to be an unexpected competitor to Novak Djokovic. But, in the end, his sustenance was declined.

In the Women's Singles, last year's quarterfinalist Ekaterina Makarova provided the upset of the day after defeating 5th seed Angelique Kerber to reach her second straight quarterfinal at the Australian Open. world no. 2 Maria Sharapova continues her dominant force in the tournament with a victory over unseeded Kirsten Flipkens, which meant she has only lost 5 games en route to the quarterfinals, the fewest since 1988. China's Li Na reaches her first slam quarterfinal since her win at the 2011 French Open when she beat German Julia Görges. 4th seed Agnieszka Radwańska continues her undefeated run in 2013 when she got through 13th seed Ana Ivanovic in another straight sets win.

 Day 7 attendance: 62,812
 Seeds out:
Men's Singles:  Janko Tipsarević [8],  Stanislas Wawrinka [15],  Kei Nishikori [16]
Women's Singles:  Angelique Kerber [5],  Ana Ivanovic [13],  Julia Görges [18]
Men's Doubles:  Aisam-ul-Haq Qureshi /  Jean-Julien Rojer [6]
Women's Doubles:  Nadia Petrova /  Katarina Srebotnik [5],  Liezel Huber /  María José Martínez Sánchez [6],  Irina-Camelia Begu /  Monica Niculescu [13],  Hsieh Su-wei /  Peng Shuai [15]
Schedule of Play

Day 8 (21 January)

In the Men's Singles, It was a match between Frenchman Jérémy Chardy and Italian Andreas Seppi, who are both trying to reach the quarterfinals of a slam for the first time. It was Chardy who came through in four sets, dominating the final three sets He was followed by compatriots 7th seed Jo-Wilfried Tsonga and 9th seed Richard Gasquet in an all French fourth round, where Tsonga came through in four sets as well. 3rd seed Andy Murray made quick work of a clearly hampered Gilles Simon winning. In the night match, Roger Federer took on another up-and-comer in Milos Raonic, the two battled it out in the first two sets with both going to Federer. Federer then cruised through the final set.

In the Women's Singles, former world no. 1 Caroline Wozniacki took on 2-time slam champion Svetlana Kuznetsova in a heavily contested match, which saw Kuznetsova prevailing in three sets to be the only woman in quarterfinals not to be seeded. After her third round scare, defending champion Victoria Azarenka made quick work of Russia's Elena Vesnina with a win in just 57 minutes. In a bother of the youngsters it was 19 year old Sloane Stephens and 21 year old Bojana Jovanovski, where the American Stephens came through against Serb Jovanovski in three sets. In the night match it was Serena Williams who claimed her 20th straight victory with a win over Maria Kirilenko, serving an impressive 87% of first serves in.

 Day 8 attendance: 44,902
 Seeds out:
Men's Singles:  Richard Gasquet [9],  Milos Raonic [13],  Gilles Simon [14],  Andreas Seppi [21]
Women's Singles:  Caroline Wozniacki [10],  Maria Kirilenko [14]
Men's Doubles:  Mahesh Bhupathi /  Daniel Nestor [5]
Women's Doubles:  Natalie Grandin /  Vladimíra Uhlířová [14]
Mixed Doubles:  Andrea Hlaváčková /  Daniele Bracciali [7]
Schedule of Play

Day 9 (22 January)

In the Men's Singles, The first quarterfinal match of the tournament, between Spaniards 4th seed David Ferrer and 10th seed Nicolás Almagro in the third all-Spanish quarterfinal in the Australian Open. The higher-ranked Spaniard Ferrer came through despite Almagro serving for the match three times at 5–4 in the third, 5–4 in the fourth, and 6–5 in the fourth, though not having match points. In the night match, world no. 1 and 2-time defending champion Novak Djokovic scraped through in 4 sets against 5th seed Tomáš Berdych.

In the Women's Singles, the opener saw Poland's Agnieszka Radwańska take on China's Li Na. It was Li who took control of the match and advance to the semifinals with a win to end Radwańska's 13 match winning streak. In the second quarterfinals, it featured an all-Russian affair with a repeat of last year's quarterfinal between Maria Sharapova and Ekaterina Makarova, with Sharapova once again coming through with relative ease with a win.

 Day 9 attendance: 38,283
 Seeds out:
Men's Singles:  Tomáš Berdych [5],  Nicolás Almagro [10]
Women's Singles:  Agnieszka Radwańska [4],  Ekaterina Makarova [19]
Men's Doubles:  David Marrero /  Fernando Verdasco [11]
Women's Doubles:  Nuria Llagostera Vives /  Zheng Jie [7],  Serena Williams /  Venus Williams [12]
Mixed Doubles:  Elena Vesnina /  Leander Paes [2]
Schedule of Play

Day 10 (23 January)

In the Men's Singles, The first match saw US Open champion Andy Murray took on the only unseeded quarterfinalist Jérémy Chardy in which the Brit came out comfortably 6–4, 6–1, 6–2 to advance to the semifinals. In the last quarterfinals of the tournament, second seed Roger Federer took on seventh seed Jo-Wilfried Tsonga in a tough match that went 5 sets and the two players trading sets, which saw Federer coming through.

In the Women's Singles, the play began with two slam champions Victoria Azarenka and Svetlana Kuznetsova taking on each other. Kuznetsova took a 4–1 lead in the first, but Azarenka took 12 of the last 14 games winning the match. In the other quarterfinal, it was an all-American clash between Serena Williams and Sloane Stephens, providing the upset of the tournament when Stephens defeated Williams.

 Day 10 attendance: 36,353
Seeds out:
Men's Singles:  Jo-Wilfried Tsonga [7]
Women's Singles:  Serena Williams [3]
Women's Doubles:  Ekaterina Makarova /  Elena Vesnina [4]
Schedule of Play

Day 11 (24 January)

In the Men's singles, 2-time defending champion Novak Djokovic took on 4th seed David Ferrer. Djokovic made quick work of defeating Ferrer. Djokovic made 30 winners to 16 unforced errors, while Ferrer made 11 winners to 32 unforced errors.

In the Women's singles, the first semifinal featured two of the most recent French Open champions 2012 winner Maria Sharapova and 2011 winner Li Na. Li came through comfortably winning to advance to her second Australian Open final. Li made 21 winners and 18 unforced errors to Sharapova's 17 winners and 32 unforced errors. In the second semifinals defending champion from Belarus Victoria Azarenka took on American Sloane Stephens. Azarenka came through also with ease winning in her sixth match point despite failing to convert five match points and to serve it out at 5–3.

 Day 11 attendance: 31,497
Seeds out:
Men's Singles:  David Ferrer [4]
Women's Singles:  Maria Sharapova [2],  Sloane Stephens [29]
Men's Doubles:  Marcel Granollers /  Marc López [3]
Mixed Doubles:  Sania Mirza /  Bob Bryan [3],  Nadia Petrova /  Mahesh Bhupathi [5]
Schedule of Play

Day 12 (25 January)

In the Men's Singles, it was Wimbledon champion Roger Federer taking on US Open champion Andy Murray. Murray took a two sets to one lead and served for the match at 6–5 in the fourth but Federer broke back and won the tie-break to take it to a fifth. Murray won the fifth set, defeating Federer for the first time in a slam.

In the Women's doubles, the no. 1 team of Italians Sara Errani and Roberta Vinci took on Australian wildcard Ashleigh Barty and Casey Dellacqua and won in three sets to win 3 of the last 4 slams.

 Day 12 attendance: 22,103
Seeds out:
Men's Singles:      Roger Federer [2]
Schedule of Play

Day 13 (26 January)

Day 13 saw the finals of the Girls', Boys' and Women's singles as well as the Men's doubles.

Ana Konjuh, who had already won the Girls' Doubles with partner Belinda Bencic, defeated Kateřina Siniaková in straight sets to take the Girls' singles title. In doing so Konjuh took the No. 1 junior ranking.

Also in straight sets, Australian Nick Kyrgios defeated compatriot Thanasi Kokkinakis to take the Boys' Singles title having not lost a set all tournament. Scans the previous day had discovered a stress fracture in the left side of Kokkinakis' back, and his movement during the final was reported to be evidently hampered.

In the Women's final, due to her controversial medical time-out in her semifinal match, defending champion Victoria Azarenka's reception onto the Rod Laver Arena was much more subdued than that of her opponent Li Na. The opening set saw seven breaks of serve in total, with Li Na winning 6–4. During the second set, with Azarenka 3–1 up, Li twisted her left ankle and called the first of two 10-minute medical time-outs. Li was not able to undo her opponent's advantage, Azerenka won the set 6–4 to level the match. The match was also interrupted at the beginning of the third set due to Australia Day fireworks. Li rolled her left ankle once again on the first point after play resumed, this time also heavily knocking the rear of her head on the court, thus incurring another 10-minute medical time-out. Azarenka broke in the fifth game and maintained the advantage to take the set 6–3 and win the match two sets to one.

The victory was Azarenka's second Australian Open title. In post-match interviews she declared that "This one is way more emotional".

Top seeds Bob and Mike Bryan defeated Robin Haase and Igor Sijsling to claim their 6th Men's Doubles Australian Open title and their 13th Grand Slam, surpassing John Newcombe and Tony Roche's record for the most doubles majors. Though Haase and Sijsling broke the serve in the opening game, the match was won by the Bryans in straight sets.

 Day 13 attendance: 20,036
Seeds out:
Women's Singles:  Li Na [6]
Schedule of Play

Day 14 (27 January)

In the Mixed doubles final, Australian wildcard entries Jarmila Gajdošová and Matthew Ebden defeated the Czech pair of Lucie Hradecká and František Čermák in straight sets. Two breaks of the Hradecká serve gave the Australians the first set. In the second set Gajdošová and Ebden were a break up, but the Hradecká and Čermák managed to break back. The advantage was recovered in the 11th game, and the Australians won the second set 7–5 after a long return from Cermak.

Defending Champion Novak Djokovic defeated Andy Murray in four sets to take his third consecutive Australian Open title, being the first man in the Open Era to do so. Murray and Djokovic took the first and second sets respectively, both on tiebreaks. The first break of serve came when Djokovic took the eighth game of the third set. In post-match interviews Djokovic stated he tried to be more aggressive in the third and fourth sets, coming to the net more often.
The match was Djokovic's 21st successive victory at the Australian Open.

Though Murray received treatment for a blister after the first set, he insisted it had no impact on the result. After the match, Djokovic was quoted as saying "I'm full of joy right now. It's going to give me a lot of confidence for the rest of the season."

 Day 14 attendance: 25,061
 Seeds out:
 Men's Singles:  Andy Murray [3]
 Schedule of Play

References

Day-by-day summaries
Australian Open (tennis) by year – Day-by-day summaries